Razupenem (PTZ-601) is a broad spectrum injectable antibiotic, from the carbapenem subgroup of beta-lactam antibiotics. It was developed as a replacement drug to combat bacteria that had acquired antibiotic resistance to commonly used antibiotics. Razupenem performed well against a variety of bacterial strains, but further development is in doubt due to a high rate of side effects in Phase II clinical trials.

References 

Carbapenem antibiotics